Li Kou-tin (born 16 November 1938) is a former table tennis player from Taiwan.  He won a gold medal in the Men's Singles event at the Asian Games in 1958.

References

Taiwanese male table tennis players
1938 births
Asian Games medalists in table tennis
Table tennis players at the 1958 Asian Games
Table tennis players at the 1966 Asian Games
Living people
Asian Games gold medalists for Chinese Taipei
Asian Games silver medalists for Chinese Taipei
Asian Games bronze medalists for Chinese Taipei
Medalists at the 1958 Asian Games
Medalists at the 1966 Asian Games
20th-century Taiwanese people